Catillaria is a genus of crustose lichens in the family Catillariaceae. The genus was circumscribed by Italian lichenologist Abramo Bartolommeo Massalongo in 1852. It is the type genus of Catillariaceae, which was circumscribed by Austrian lichenologist Josef Hafellner in 1984.

Species
Catillaria alboflavicans 
Catillaria aphana 
Catillaria atomarioides 
Catillaria australica 
Catillaria austrolittoralis 
Catillaria banksiae 
Catillaria brisbanensis 
Catillaria chalybeia 
Catillaria contristans 
Catillaria croceella 
Catillaria distorta 
Catillaria effugiens 
Catillaria erysiboides 
Catillaria flavicans 
Catillaria flexuosa  – the Netherlands
Catillaria frenchiana 
Catillaria fungoides  – Africa; Asia; Europe
Catillaria gerroana  – Australia
Catillaria gilbertii  – Scotland
Catillaria glaucogrisea 
Catillaria glauconigrans 
Catillaria golubkovae 
Catillaria grossulina 
Catillaria laevigata  – Australia
Catillaria lenticularis 
Catillaria lobariicola 
Catillaria melaclina 
Catillaria melaclinoides 
Catillaria minuta 
Catillaria modesta 
Catillaria mycophila 
Catillaria nigroclavata  – China; Taiwan
Catillaria nigroisidiata 
Catillaria patteeana 
Catillaria phaeoloma 
Catillaria picila 
Catillaria rimosa 
Catillaria rudolphii 
Catillaria zschackei 
Catillaria scleroplaca 
Catillaria scotinodes 
Catillaria stereocaulorum 
Catillaria subfuscata 
Catillaria subpraedicta  – Canary Islands
Catillaria subviridis 
Catillaria superflua 
Catillaria tasmanica 
Catillaria tenuilimbata 
Catillaria trachonoides 
Catillaria ulleungdoensis  – South Korea
Catillaria umbratilis 
Catillaria usneicola

References

Lecanorales
Lecanorales genera
Lichen genera
Taxa described in 1852
Taxa named by Abramo Bartolommeo Massalongo